Caitlin Van Sickle (born January 26, 1990) is an American field hockey player. In July 2016, Van Sickle was named to the United States women's field hockey team for the 2016 Summer Olympics in Rio de Janeiro.

Early life
Caitlin Van Sickle was born in Wilmington, Delaware. Her mother was a golf pro at DuPont Country Club, leading Caitlin to play golf at an early age. Van Sickle also played soccer by age 6 and started playing field hockey in fourth grade. She excelled at field hockey, basketball, and lacrosse as a student at Tower Hill in Wilmington. One of her classmates, until 6th grade, at Tower Hill included future Olympic basketball player Elena Delle Donne.

Collegiate field hockey player
Van Sickle attended the University of North Carolina (UNC) where she played on the field hockey team. During Van Sickle's time on the team, they won the NCAA Division I Championship for field hockey. Van Sickle was named an All-American defender three times.

United States national field hockey team
Van Sickle was an alternate for the United States national field hockey team at the 2015 Pan Am Games. She then joined the national team for Champions Trophy where she contributed a goal in a 2–2 tie game against Australia. One of her national team teammates, Katelyn Falgowski, was also her roommate and teammate at UNC. On July 1, 2016, Van Sickle was named to the United States women's field hockey team for the 2016 Summer Olympics in Rio de Janeiro. Van Sickle scored the deciding goal in the team's second game of Olympic preliminary play against Australia.

References

External links
 
 
 

1990 births
Living people
American female field hockey players
Female field hockey defenders
Olympic field hockey players of the United States
Field hockey players at the 2016 Summer Olympics
Pan American  Games bronze medalists for the United States
Pan American Games medalists in field hockey
Field hockey players at the 2019 Pan American Games
North Carolina Tar Heels field hockey players
Sportspeople from Wilmington, Delaware
Medalists at the 2019 Pan American Games